Ashley "Ash" Matthew Hunter (born 29 September 1995) is an English professional footballer who plays as a forward for EFL League One club Morecambe.

After spending time in the youth setups of several clubs in the Midlands and Yorkshire, Hunter began his career with non-league Ilkeston, where he made his début in 2014. He quickly attracted the attention of Fleetwood Town, where he made over 200 appearances before departing for Salford in 2020.

Career

Early career
Hunter joined Northern Premier League side Ilkeston after being released by Burton Albion in summer 2014. After scoring 13 goals for Ilkeston's under-21 side, he made an immediate impact in the first team, scoring twice in his first start for the club. He was signed by League One side Fleetwood Town for a "sizeable fee" in January 2015.

Fleetwood Town
Hunter made his Fleetwood début on 7 February, coming on as substitute in a 1–1 with Peterborough United in a League One fixture and almost setting up a goal for Jamie Proctor. His first goal came on 6 April when he scored Fleetwood's final goal in a 4–0 win against Yeovil Town. His next goal came on 6 October in the first game of new manager Steven Pressley, scoring the equaliser in an eventual 2–1 victory against Shrewsbury Town in the second round of the EFL Trophy. On Boxing Day, Hunter came on as a substitute and scored instantly to secure a 1–1 draw in the league against Shrewsbury.

On 10 August 2016, Hunter scored an 11th-minute equaliser against Leeds United in the first round of the EFL Cup, taking the two teams into a penalty shoot-out which Fleetwood lost 5–4, with Hunter converting his penalty. A week later, Hunter signed a new three-year contract with Fleetwood. The next day, he came on as a substitute and scored to make it 2–0 against Oxford United to secure Fleetwood's first win of the season. On 27 August, he scored his sides second in another 2–0 win, this time away to Southend United, their first away victory of the season. Hunter was awarded the man of the match for his performance in the FA Cup first round replay against Southport, scoring one goal and creating another in extra-time of a 4–1 win. In the replay of their second-round game against Shrewsbury, Hunter scored the winning goal in the 95th minute to help Fleetwood complete a comeback from 2–0 down, and reach the third round for the second time in their history.

On 9 September, Hunter scored a 93rd-minute penalty to secure a point at home to Oldham Athletic, and three days later he scored the winning goal against Bury in a 3–2 victory. on Boxing Day, Hunter scored Fleetwood's second goal of a 2–1 win in the reverse fixture against Oldham, their first win in nine games. He opened the scoring four days later in the second league meeting against Bury, a 2–0 victory which ensured back-to-back away wins for the first time in the season. On 25 February 2018, Hunter scored the first goal in the reign of new manager John Sheridan, scoring the equaliser in a 1–1 draw with Milton Keynes. In March 2018, he signed a new three-year deal to keep him contracted to the club until 2021.

On 14 August, Hunter scored the winning penalty in a the first round of the EFL Cup after a 1–1 draw with Crewe Alexandra. On 1 September, he scored the winner to help new manager Joey Barton win his first home game as manager, a 2–1 win against Bradford City. After receiving five yellow cards in the opening nine games, Hunter received a one-match ban, missing a fixture against Barnsley as a result.

On 2 March 2019, he came off the bench to score Fleetwood's second in a 2–0 win against Plymouth Argyle, keeping their chances of a play-off place alive. On 19 April, he scored a 94th-minute equaliser against Peterborough United, helping keep the pressure off Barton.

Salford City (loan)
In January 2020, Fleetwood manager Joey Barton reported that he was due to go out on loan to Salford City after an agreement was made between the clubs. The move was later confirmed by Salford.

On 18 January, Hunter was sent off on his début after picking up two yellow cards in a match against Forest Green Rovers. He scored his first goal for the club ten days later, scoring the third goal of a 4–0 away win against Cambridge United, when he "hooked a fine finish into the far corner". On 7 March, Hunter scored both goals in a 2–0 victory against Bradford City, the first of which was later voted Salford's goal of the season.

Salford City
Hunter joined Salford permanently on 17 July, signing a two-year deal for an undisclosed fee. He scored his first goal after rejoining the club on the opening day of the 2020–21 season against Exeter City, scoring the equalising goal in a 2–2 draw. On 24 November, he scored two "stunning" goals in a 2–1 victory over Morecambe. On 6 December, Hunter scored the only goal against Barrow in the club's first Football League game with an attendance since 1972.  He was released by Salford at the end of the 2021–22 season.

Morecambe
On 12 July 2022, Hunter joined League One club Morecambe on a one-year deal.

Career statistics

Honours
Salford City
EFL Trophy: 2019–20

References

External links

1995 births
Living people
English footballers
Footballers from Derby
Association football forwards
Burton Albion F.C. players
Ilkeston F.C. players
Fleetwood Town F.C. players
Salford City F.C. players
Morecambe F.C. players
Northern Premier League players
English Football League players